Tupitsyno is a rural locality (a village) in Vozhegodskoye Urban Settlement, Vozhegodsky District, Vologda Oblast, Russia. The population was 13 as of 2002.

Geography 
Tupitsyno is located 11 km southwest of Vozhega (the district's administrative centre) by road. Zinenskaya is the nearest rural locality.

References 

Rural localities in Vozhegodsky District